The capstan equation or belt friction equation, also known as Euler-Eytelwein's formula (after Leonhard Euler and Johann Albert Eytelwein), relates the hold-force to the load-force if a flexible line is wound around a cylinder (a bollard, a winch or a capstan).

Because of the interaction of frictional forces and tension, the tension on a line wrapped around a capstan may be different on either side of the capstan.  A small holding force exerted on one side can carry a much larger loading force on the other side; this is the principle by which a capstan-type device operates.

A holding capstan is a ratchet device that can turn only in one direction; once a load is pulled into place in that direction, it can be held with a much smaller force.  A powered capstan, also called a winch, rotates so that the applied tension is multiplied by the friction between rope and capstan.  On a tall ship a holding capstan and a powered capstan are used in tandem so that a small force can be used to raise a heavy sail and then the rope can be easily removed from the powered capstan and tied off.

In rock climbing this effect allows a lighter person to hold (belay) a heavier person when top-roping, and also produces rope drag during lead climbing.

The formula is

Several assumptions must be true for the formula to be valid:
 The rope is on the verge of full sliding, i.e.  is the maximum load that one can hold. Smaller loads can be held as well, resulting in a smaller effective contact angle .
 It is important that the line is not rigid, in which case significant force would be lost in the bending of the line tightly around the cylinder. (The equation must be modified for this case.) For instance a Bowden cable is to some extent rigid and doesn't obey the principles of the capstan equation.
 The line is non-elastic.

It can be observed that the force gain increases exponentially with the coefficient of friction, the number of turns around the cylinder, and the angle of contact. Note that the radius of the cylinder has no influence on the force gain.

The table below lists values of the factor  based on the number of turns and coefficient of friction μ.

From the table it is evident why one seldom sees a sheet (a rope to the loose side of a sail) wound more than three turns around a winch. The force gain would be extreme besides being counter-productive since there is risk of a riding turn, result being that the sheet will foul, form a knot and not run out when eased (by slacking grip on the tail (free end)).

It is both ancient and modern practice for anchor capstans and jib winches to be slightly flared out at the base, rather than cylindrical, to prevent the rope (anchor warp or sail sheet) from sliding down. The rope wound several times around the winch can slip upwards gradually, with little risk of a riding turn, provided it is tailed (loose end is pulled clear), by hand or a self-tailer.

For instance, the factor "153,552,935" (5 turns around a capstan with a coefficient of friction of 0.6) means, in theory, that a newborn baby would be capable of holding (not moving) the weight of two  supercarriers (97,000 tons each, but for the baby it would be only a little more than 1 kg).  The large number of turns around the capstan combined with such a high friction coefficient mean that very little additional force is necessary to hold such heavy weight in place.  The cables necessary to support this weight, as well as the capstan's ability to withstand the crushing force of those cables, are separate considerations.

Derivation 
The applied tension  is a function of  the total angle subtended by the rope on the capstan. On the verge of slipping, this is also the frictional force, which is by definition  times the normal force . Combining these and considering infinitesimally small  yields the differential equation

whose solution is

Generalizations

Generalization of the capstan equation for a V-belt 

The belt friction equation for a v-belt is:

 

where  is the angle (in radians) between the two flat sides of the pulley that the v-belt presses against.

The material of a V-belt or multi-V serpentine belt tends to wedge into the mating groove in a pulley as the load increases, improving torque transmission.

For the same power transmission, a V-belt requires less tension than a flat belt, increasing bearing life.

Generalization of the capstan equation for a rope lying on an arbitrary orthotropic surface 
If a rope is lying in equilibrium under tangential forces on a rough orthotropic surface then all three following conditions are satisfied:

 No separation – normal reaction  is positive for all points of the rope curve:
 , where  is a normal curvature of the rope curve.
 Dragging coefficient of friction  and angle  are satisfying the following criteria for all points of the curve
 
 Limit values of the tangential forces:
 
 with 
 where is a geodesic curvature of the rope curve,  is a curvature of a rope curve, is a coefficient of friction in the tangential direction.
 If  then 

This generalization has been obtained by Konyukhov.

See also
Belt friction
Frictional contact mechanics
Torque amplifier, a device that exploits the capstan effect

References

Further reading
 Arne Kihlberg, Kompendium i Mekanik för E1, del II, Göteborg 1980, 60–62.

External links
 Capstan equation calculator

Equations of physics
Winches